The MG EX-E is a concept car that was produced by MG and presented at the Frankfurt Motor Show in 1985. The EX-E was a mid-engined sports car inspired by the Ferrari 308 and designed by Roy Axe and Gerry McGovern. The car's drivetrain and chassis were derived from the mid-engined MG Metro 6R4 rally car. The EX-E concept car did not lead to a production version, although Gerry McGovern did go on to style the later, smaller MG F sports car.

The car is now preserved in the Heritage Motor Centre, Gaydon.

References 

Concept cars
MG experimental and prototype models